Eduard Pons Prades (1920–2007) was a Catalan historian and anarchist. Pons Prades was a Confederación Nacional del Trabajo (CNT) member who joined the Republicans in the Spanish Civil War. Wounded in 1938, he joined the French resistance and fought as a guerrilla in Aude. He was once captured in a secret trip to Spain in 1946 but escaped. Pons Prades left France in 1964, returning to Spain. He founded the publisher Alfaguara and has written in multiple history journals and literary magazines.

Works 

Novels:
La Venganza (1966)
Non-fiction
Años de muerte y de esperanza (1979) 
Morir por la libertad: Españoles en los campos de exterminio nazis (1995) 
El Holocausto de los Republicanos Españoles: Vida y Muerte, en los Campos de Exterminio Alemanes (1940–1945) (2005) 
Guerrillas españolas: 1936-1960 
Los niños republicanos en la guerra de España 
Un soldado de la República: Itinerario ibérico de un joven revolucionario, with Leopoldo de Luis 
Los republicanos en la II Guerra Mundial 
Los vencidos y el exilio 
Los años oscuros de la transición española
Los que SÍ hicimos la guerra
Francia: verano de 1944
Españoles en los maquis franceses
Los cerdos del comandante (españoles en los campos de exterminio alemanes)
Crónica negra de la transición española 1976–1985
Las guerras de los niños republicanos 1936–1995
El mensaje de otros mundos
Los senderos de la libertad (Europa 1936–1945)
La guerrilla española en la II guerra mundial ¡Destruir la columna alemana!
Las guerras de Picasso (2007)

References

External links

1920 births
2007 deaths
Writers from Barcelona
Syndicalist Party politicians
Confederación Nacional del Trabajo members
Spanish male novelists
20th-century Spanish historians
Spanish anarchists
Spanish military personnel of the Spanish Civil War (Republican faction)
20th-century Spanish novelists
Spanish maquis